Kazimierz Kierzkowski (10 August 1890 in Międzyrzec Podlaski – March 1942 in Auschwitz) was a Polish political and social activist, major of the Polish Army and member of the Armia Krajowa.

During the Second World War he was murdered in the German concentration camp Auschwitz.

1890 births
1942 deaths
People from Międzyrzec Podlaski
Polish Army officers
Home Army members
Military personnel who died in Nazi concentration camps
Polish military personnel of World War II
Polish people who died in Auschwitz concentration camp